Innocents Aboard is a short story collection by American science fiction and fantasy author Gene Wolfe published in 2004. The stories are primarily fantasy or horror, not science-fiction.  The title is an homage to Mark Twain's first book, The Innocents Abroad. The book was nominated for a Locus Award in 2005.

List of stories
The Tree Is My Hat
The Old Woman Whose Rolling Pin Is the Sun
The Friendship Light
Slow Children At Play 
Under Hill
The Monday Man
The Waif
The Legend of Xi Cygnus
The Sailor Who Sailed After the Sun
How the Bishop Sailed to Inniskeen
Houston, 1943
A Fish Story
Wolfer
The Eleventh City
The Night Chough (related to The Book of the Long Sun)
The Wrapper
A Traveler in Desert Lands
The Walking Sticks
Queen
Pocketsful of Diamonds
Copperhead
The Lost Pilgrim

References

2004 short story collections
Fantasy short story collections
Short story collections by Gene Wolfe
Tor Books books